The mannerist architecture and sculpture in Poland have two major traditions – Polish/Italian and Dutch/Flemish, that dominated in northern Poland. The Silesian mannerism of South-Western Poland was largely influenced by Bohemian and German mannerism, while the Pomeranian mannerism of North-Western Poland was influenced by Gothic tradition and Northern German mannerism. The Jews in Poland adapted patterns of Italian and Polish mannerism to their own tradition. The mannerist complex of Kalwaria Zebrzydowska and mannerist City of Zamość are UNESCO World Heritage Sites.

Triangle gables of late Gothic origin and large windows are the features of Dutch urban architecture in Northern Poland. Among notable architects and sculptors of Dutch/Flemish mannerism in Poland were Anthonis van Obbergen, Willem van den Blocke, Abraham van den Blocke, Jan Strakowski, Paul Baudarth, Gerhard Hendrik, Hans Kramer and Regnier van Amsterdam.

Kuyavian-Pomeranian Voivodeship

Podlaskie Voivodeship

Pomeranian Voivodeship

Warmian-Masurian Voivodeship

West Pomeranian Voivodeship

See also
List of mannerist structures in Central Poland
List of mannerist structures in Southern Poland

Notes and references

Mannerist architecture in Poland